The 2016 San Marino and Rimini Riviera motorcycle Grand Prix was the thirteenth round of the 2016 MotoGP season. It was held at the Misano World Circuit Marco Simoncelli in Misano Adriatico on 11 September 2016.

Classification

MotoGP
After the first three practice sessions Michele Pirro, who was already competing in the event as a wild card entry, was designated as the replacement rider for the injured Andrea Iannone.

 Jack Miller withdrew from the race due to pain in his right hand.

Moto2

Moto3

 Jorge Martin suffered a broken foot in a crash during qualifying.

Championship standings after the race (MotoGP)
Below are the standings for the top five riders and constructors after round thirteen has concluded.

Riders' Championship standings

Constructors' Championship standings

 Note: Only the top five positions are included for both sets of standings.

Notes

References

San Marino
San Marino and Rimini Riviera motorcycle Grand Prix
San Marino and Rimini Riviera motorcycle Grand Prix
San Marino and Rimini Riviera motorcycle Grand Prix